One Morning Left is a Finnish metalcore band formed by singer Mika Lahti at 2008 in Vaasa. The band enjoys popularity in Finland and has also toured Germany, Latvia, Lithuania, Finland, Iceland, Japan and Russia. They have released three full-length albums and two EPs.

Detailed information 
Their first full-length album, The Bree-Teenz, was released on 24 August 2011 by Spinefarm Records. Their second album, Our Sceneration was recorded during the summer of 2012, but was released at 22 February 2013.

In the spring of 2014 drummer and clean vocalist Tomi Takamaa announced that he had left the band. Shortly after the band would announce that their new drummer is Niko Hyttinen, who has formerly played in band Snow White's Poison Bite. They also announced that the clean vocals and second guitar would be played by Leevi Luoto from band called ARF.

On December 16, 2015, the band announced that they had been dropped from Spinefarm and signed with American-based label Imminence Records for the North American and Oceania territories. They also announced the release of their third album, Metalcore Superstars, for January 22, 2016.

After the release Metalcore Superstars band toured a lot in clubs and festivals in Finland, Baltics, Europe, Iceland and Japan. 

Right now One Morning Left is making their fourth full-length album.

Members

Current members
Mika Lahti - unclean vocals
Juuso Turkki - guitar & backing vocals
Leevi Luoto - guitar, clean vocals
Touko Keippilä - keyboards
Miska Sipiläinen- bass guitar & backing vocals

Former members
Tomi Takamaa - drums and clean vocals
Tuomas Teittinen - bass guitar
Roni Harju - guitar and clean vocals
Oula Maaranen - guitar
Teemu Rautiainen – bass guitar
Valtteri Numminen – drums
Veli-Matti Kananen – bass guitar, keyboards
Ari Levola - guitar
Liam McCourt - lead guitar
Niko Hyttinen – drums
Tuukka Ojansivu – guitar & backing vocals

Discography

Albums 
 2011: The Bree-TeenZ
 2013: Our Sceneration
 2016: Metalcore Superstars
 2021: Hyperactive

EPs 
 2008: Panda Loves Penguin
 2009: Panda Loves Penguin Vol. 2

Singles 
 2011: !liaf cipE
 2014: The Star of Africa
 2015: You're Dead, Let's Disco!
 2016: Metalcore Superstars Remixed
 2020: Neon Highway
 2021: Ruby Dragon
 2021: Sinners Are Winners
 2021: Ruthless Resistance
 2021: Creatvres
 2021: Beat It
 2021: Intergalactic Casanova
 2022: Tonight

References

External links

Finnish musical groups
Metalcore musical groups
Electronicore musical groups
Post-hardcore groups
Musical groups established in 2008
Arising Empire artists